Form Activity Motion is a remix EP by the Boston electronic band Freezepop, released online on November 11, 2008.A physical CD was released on January 27, 2009. The EP has remixes of previous songs along with one new track, "Moons of Jupiter".

Track listing

Additionally, Freezepop released the music video for their song "Frontload" with the release of Form Activity Motion with download of the album.

References

External links
 Freezepop.net

Freezepop albums
2008 EPs
2008 remix albums
Remix EPs
Electropop remix albums